Waggaman is a census-designated place and unincorporated community in Jefferson Parish, Louisiana,  United States. Waggaman is on the West Bank of the Mississippi River, within the New Orleans–Metairie–Kenner metropolitan statistical area. The population was 9,835 at the 2020 census. The area was named for U.S. Senator George Augustus Waggaman (1782–1843).

History

George Augustus Waggaman settled in the area with his wife, Camille Arnoult, who inherited a large tract of land there. The two built a considerable plantation which they named Avondale, which later succumbed to the Mississippi River in 1892. Today the Avondale area, an unincorporated community which abuts Waggaman, was home to Avondale Shipyards, one of the largest employers in Jefferson Parish.

Geography
Waggaman is located on the west side of Jefferson Parish at  (29.929856, -90.230053), on the southwest side of the Mississippi River. It is bordered to the southeast by Avondale. Across the Mississippi, it is bordered to the north by Kenner, to the northeast by River Ridge, and to the east by Harahan. U.S. Route 90 forms the southern border of Waggaman and leads east  into New Orleans. Louisiana Highway 18 (River Road) runs along the river side of the community, leading east into Avondale and west (upriver)  to Interstate 310 in Luling.

Demographics

The 2019 American Community Survey determined 10,017 people lived in the CDP, an increase of 2 people since the 2010 U.S. census. At the 2020 census, there were 9,835 people in the CDP. In 2019, the racial and ethnic makeup of the CDP was 65.7% Black or African American, 24.8% non-Hispanic white, 1.1% American Indian and Alaska Native, 1.5% some other race, 2.4% multiracial, and 6.3% Hispanic and Latino American of any race. A year later, the racial and ethnic makeup was a tabulated 64.62% Black or African American, 23.41% non-Hispanic white, 0.48% American Indian and Alaska Native, 1.27% Asian, 2.97% multiracial or of another race, and 7.26% Hispanic and Latino American of any race. The median household income was $46,075 and 30.1% of the population lived at or below the poverty line in 2019.

Education

Jefferson Parish Public School System serves Waggaman.

A single elementary school in Waggaman, Lucille Cherbonnier/Norbert Rillieux Elementary School, serves the city. Previously the Cherbonnier/Rillieux school was two separate campuses: Norbert Rillieux Elementary School and Cherbonnier Elementary School. In 2012 the superintendent recommended that the schools be consolidated with the Cherbonnier campus being used. All residents are zoned to Henry Ford Middle School in Avondale and L.W. Higgins High School in Marrero. In regards to advanced studies academies, residents are zoned to the Marrero Academy.

Jefferson Parish Library operates the Live Oak Library in Waggaman. The library, located adjacent to Thomas Jefferson Park, opened in 1989. It is designed to appear similar to an Acadian style cottage.

References

External links

 Lucille Cherbonnier/Norbert Rillieux Elementary School
 Live Oak Manor Elementary School

Census-designated places in Jefferson Parish, Louisiana
Census-designated places in Louisiana
Census-designated places in New Orleans metropolitan area
Louisiana populated places on the Mississippi River